Muhammad ibn Hatim was the twelfth Tayyibi Isma'ili dāʿī al-muṭlaq in Yemen, in 1328–29. 

Muhammad ibn Hatim tenure was one of the shortest among the Yemeni dāʿīs.

He succeeded Ibrahim ibn al-Husayn, and was in turn succeeded by Ibrahim's son, Ali Shams al-Din I.

Family
He was the grandson of the eighth dāʿī, al-Husayn ibn Ali. He had three sons, Ali, Abd al-Muttalib and Abbas.

Tomb
His grave, along with those of the 11th and 13th dāʿīs, were hidden and unknown until recently, when the archaeological authority of Yemen, along with Dawoodi Bohras living there, located them on Hisn Af'ida. On 25 November 2018, Mufaddal Saifuddin, the 53rd dāʿī al-muṭlaq, unveiled its existence.

Gallery

References

Sources
 

Year of birth unknown
1329 deaths
Banu al-Walid al-Anf
Tayyibi da'is
14th-century Arabs
14th century in Yemen
14th-century Ismailis
14th-century Islamic religious leaders